Magic, Inc. is a publisher of magic books and retailer of magic products in North America.

It is one of the oldest continuously family-run brick-and-mortar magic companies in North America.

Location
The original store, then called the Ireland Magic Company, was located on 109 N. Dearborn in the Chicago Loop. In 1963, the store was renamed Magic, Inc. and moved to its long-occupied location at 5082 N. Lincoln Ave., Chicago, Illinois. As of 2016, the store relocated to a new space at 1838 W. Lawrence Avenue, in Chicago.

The company's store has been frequented by several magicians and illusionists such as Penn & Teller, Harry Blackstone Sr. & Jr., and Lance Burton.

History
In 1926, Laurie L. Ireland founded the original business, the Ireland Magic Company. Soon after his death in 1954, James "Jay" Ward Marshall married his widow, Frances Ireland, and took ownership of the magic shop.

In 1963, the company was relocated and incorporated as Magic, Inc. by Jay Marshall and Frances Ireland Marshall.

After spending her whole life with magic, Frances Ireland Marshall died at the age of 92 on May 26, 2002.

Jay Marshall later died of a heart attack in 2005. His son Alexander "Sandy" Marshall is now owner of the company.

Publications
The company published several original titles in its early years and up to today, continues to sell copies. Frances Marshall was an early originator of publishing books on a single magic-related topic.

The Ireland Magic Company published Match-ic (1935) and 12 Tricks with a Borrowed Deck (1940) by American mathematics and science writer Martin Gardner.

Products & Services
The company sells a variety of magic products including books and pamphlets, magic sets and accessories, and collectibles. The company also has a staff of professional magicians who provide magic lessons for beginners and experienced magicians alike.

References

External links
 Magic, Inc. Homepage

Entertainment companies of the United States
Magic organizations
Publishing companies of the United States